Braciszów  is a village located in Poland, in the Opole Voivodeship, Głubczyce County and Gmina Głubczyce. The region is called Województwo opolskie.

Location

Climate
Braciszów temperatures normally range from 25 to minus 6 degrees Celsius throughout the year, having relatively warm summers and mildly cold winters.

References

Villages in Głubczyce County